The 1945 Governor General's Awards for Literary Merit were the 10th rendition of the Governor General's Awards, Canada's annual national awards program which then comprised literary awards alone. The awards recognized Canadian writers for new English-language works published in Canada during 1945 and were presented in 1946. There were no cash prizes.

As every year from 1942 to 1948, there two awards for non-fiction, and four awards in the three established categories, which recognized English-language works only.

Winners 

 Fiction:  Hugh MacLennan, Two Solitudes
 Poetry or drama: Earle Birney, Now is Time
 Non-fiction: Evelyn M. Richardson, We Keep a Light
 Non-fiction: Ross Munro, Gauntlet to Overlord

References

Governor General's Awards
Governor General's Awards
Governor General's Awards